Escambe (also known as San Cosme y San Damián de Cupaica, San Damián de Cupaica, San Cosmo y San Damías de Escambe, or San Damián de Cupahica) was a Spanish Franciscan mission built in the 17th century in the Florida Panhandle, three miles northwest of the present-day town of Tallahassee, Florida. It was part of Spain's effort to colonize the region, and convert the Timucuan and Apalachee Indians to Christianity. The mission lasted until 1704, when it was destroyed by a group of Creek Indians and South Carolinians.

The site where the original mission stood was added to the U.S. National Register of Historic Places on May 14, 1971.

San Damián de Cupaica was founded in 1639, the third Spanish mission in Apalachee Province. San Damián survived James Moore's invasion of Apalachee Province in January 1704, but was captured by Creek warriors in June 1704. When the Spanish abandoned their headquarters in San Luis de Talimali later that year, leaving all of the Apalachee Province unprotected, residents of Cupaica joined other Apalachees, Chactatos and Yemassees in migrating to the area of Pensacola, Florida.

A later mission named San Joseph de Escambe was established in 1741 at the present-day community of Molino, Florida along the Escambia River north of Pensacola, lending its name both to the river and later to Escambia County, Florida.

See also
Spanish missions in Florida

Notes

References
Milanich, Jerald T. (2006). Laboring in the Fields of the Lord: Spanish Missions and Southeastern Indians. University Press of Florida. 
 Leon County listings at National Register of Historic Places
 Leon County listings at Florida's Office of Cultural and Historical Programs
 This Date In North American Indian History - June 29 at Canku Ota (Many Paths) 
 Pensacola Colonial Frontiers project homepage 
 Mission San Joseph de Escambe 

1639 establishments in North America
1639 establishments in the Spanish Empire
Apalachee
Archaeological sites in Florida
Demolished buildings and structures in Florida
Former populated places in Leon County, Florida
National Register of Historic Places in Leon County, Florida
Muscogee
Spanish missions in Florida
Timucua